Kurt Allan Ingemar Mundebo (15 October 1930 – 7 September 2018) was a Swedish politician who was a member of the Liberal People's Party and former minister for the budget and minister of economics.

Mundebo was Member of Parliament of Sweden for Stockholm between 1965–1980. He was also the Governor of Uppsala County between 1980 and 1986.

References

External links

1930 births
2018 deaths
Members of the Riksdag from the Liberals (Sweden)
Politicians from Uppsala
Governors of Uppsala County
Members of the Riksdag 1968–1970
Members of the Riksdag 1970–1973
Members of the Riksdag 1974–1976
Members of the Riksdag 1976–1979
Members of the Riksdag 1979–1982
Economy ministers of Sweden
Swedish Ministers for the Budget